Walrus Island is a small islet located 15 km east of Saint Paul Island, Alaska in the Bering Sea. It is  part of the Pribilof Islands group. There is no resident population.

The name of this island is a translation from the Russian "Ostrov Morzhovoy" meaning "Walrus Island," published by Capt. Lt. Vasiliev of the Imperial Russian Navy (IRN) in 1829 (map 3).

This islet should not be confused with the Walrus Islands in the Walrus Islands State Game Sanctuary, located close to Hagemeister Island (in the Dillingham Census Area), nor with Walrus Island located in the southeastern shores of the Bristol Bay (in the Aleutians East Borough).

References
Walrus Island: Block 1000, Census Tract 1, Aleutians West Census Area, Alaska United States Census Bureau
USGS-GNIS

Pribilof Islands
Islands of the Aleutian Islands
Islands of the Bering Sea
Uninhabited islands of Alaska
Islands of Alaska
Islands of Unorganized Borough, Alaska